This page lists those who have won the senior title at Fleadh Cheoil na hÉireann title since its foundation in 1951 by Comhaltas Ceoltóirí Éireann. There were no competitions in 2020 and 2021 due to the Covid-19 pandemic. Once you win a senior title, you are automatically placed into the All Ireland competition the following year giving you a chance to defend the title. Whilst the majority do not return, some have defended their title on multiple occasions.

There are competitions for soloists, duos, trios, and various types of ensembles, many of which are divided into separate competitions by age group. A list of the categories is found here.

Fiddle (Fidil)

1951, Pat Kelly, County Tyrone
1952, Bobby Casey, County Clare
1953, Paddy Canny, County Clare
1954, Aggie Whyte, County Galway
1955, Seán Ryan, County Tipperary
1956, Seán Ryan, County Tipperary
1957, Jimmy McHugh, Glasgow, Scotland
1958, Seán McLoughlan, County Antrim
1959, John Gallagher, County Donegal
1960, Cáit Ní Chuis, County Limerick
1961, Séamus Connolly, County Clare
1962, Brendan McGlinchey, County Armagh
1963, Séamus Connolly, County Clare
1964, Gus Tierney, County Clare
1965, Gerry Forde, County Wexford
1966, Kathleen Collins, New York City
1967, Maura Connolly, County Laois
1968, Bobby Casey, County Clare
1969, Joe Ryan, County Clare
1970, Máirtín Byrnes, County Galway
1971, Antóin Mac Gabhann, County Cavan
1972, Antóin Mac Gabhann, County Cavan
1973, Paddy Glackin, County Dublin
1974, Vincent Griffin, County Clare
1975, Liz Carroll, Chicago, USA
1976, Jim McKillop, County Antrim
1977, Maurice Lennon, County Leitrim
1978, Seán Nugent, County Fermanagh
1979, Frank Kelly, County Donegal
1980, Eileen O'Brien, County Tipperary
1981, Martin Hayes, County Clare
1982, Martin Hayes, County Clare
1983, Jimmy McBride, County Donegal
1984, Eileen Ivers, New York City
1985, Cathal Hayden, County Tyrone
1986, Brian Conway, New York City
1987, Brendan Larrissey, County Louth
1988, Bríd Harper, County Donegal
1989, Áine O'Connor, County Limerick
1990, Brian Lavery, County Londonderry
1991, Thomas Morrow, County Leitrim
1992, Mac Dara Ó Raghallaigh, County Meath
1993, Áine McGrath, County Kildare
1994, Andrew Dinan, Manchester, England
1995, Liz Kane, County Galway
1996, Kevin Madden, Manchester, England
1997, Ursula Byrne, County Down
1998, Mark Lavery, County Londonderry
1999, Oisín Mac Diarmada, County Sligo
2000, Ita Cunningham, County Galway
2001, Zoe Conway, County Louth
2002, Fergal Scahill, County Galway
2003, Aisling Ní Choisdealbha, County Tipperary
2004, Michael O Rourke, County Clare
2005, Michael Harrison, County Tipperary
2006, Aidan O’Neill, County Tyrone
2007, Laura Beagon, County Monaghan
2008, Rónán Mac Grianna, County Mayo
2009, Johnny Canning, Glasgow, Scotland
2010, Lisa Ward, County Leitrim
2011, Tara Breen, County Clare
2012, Niall Murphy, County Armagh
2013, Lydia Warnock, County Leitrim
2014, Dylan Foley, New York, USA
2015, Aoife Cunningham, County Cavan
2016, Darragh Curtin, County Kerry
2017, Roisín Anne Hughes, Glasgow, Scotland
2018, Caoimhe Kearins, County Sligo
2019, Dylan Carlos, County Roscommon
2022, Sarah O'Gorman, County Waterford

Button Accordion (Bosca Cheoil)

1951, Joe Boland, County Offaly
1952, Frank Gavigan, County Westmeath
1953, Paddy O'Brien, County Tipperary
1954, Kieran Kelly, County Offaly
1955, Kieran Kelly, County Offaly
1956, George Ross, County Wexford
1957, Michael Mullins, County Offaly
1958, Danny Coughlan, County Offaly
1959, Joe Burke, County Galway
1960, Joe Burke, County Galway
1961, Brendan Mulhair, County Galway
1962, Martin McMahon, County Clare
1963, John Bowe, County Offaly
1964, Tommy McGuire. County Offaly
1965, Paddy Ryan, County Tipperary
1966, Tom Ferris, County Wexford
1967, Ellen Flanagan Comerford, County Offaly
1968, Dick Sherlock, County Sligo
1969, Pat Barton, County Offaly
1970, John Regan, County Sligo
1971, Paddy Gavin, County Dublin
1972, Seán Gavin, County Galway
1973, P. J. Hernon, County Galway
1974, Jackie Daly, County Cork
1975, Paddy O'Brien, County Offaly
1976, Deirdre Collis, County Sligo
1977, Gerry Hanley, County Galway
1978, Martin Connolly, County Clare
1979, John Lucid, County Kerry
1980, Séamus Walshe, County Clare
1981, Tom O'Connell, County Limerick
1982, John Nolan, New York City, USA
1983, John Whelan, Luton, England / New Jersey, USA
1984, John Connolly, County Tipperary
1985, Willie Fogarty, County Tipperary
1986, Billy McComiskey, Brooklyn, New York / Baltimore, Maryland, USA
1987, Michael Sexton, County Clare
1988, Paddy Clancy, County Limerick
1989, John Bass, County Wexford
1990, John Bass, County Wexford
1991, Michael O'Connell, London
1992, Ned Kelly, County Tipperary
1993, Colin Nea, County Westmeath
1994, Colin Nea, County Westmeath
1995, Pádraig Kinsella, County Offaly
1996, Danny O'Mahony, County Kerry
1997, Alan Costello, County Tipperary
1998, Maurice Egan, County Kerry
1999, James Kinsella, County Offaly
2000, Nuala Hehir, County Clare
2001, T. P. McNamara, County Kerry
2002, Fiachna Ó Mongain, County Mayo
2003, Oliver Diviney, County Galway
2004, Marie Walsh, County Galway
2005, Damien Mullane, West London, England
2006, Pádraig Ó Foghlú (Patrick Foley), County Limerick
2007, Damien Mullane, West London, England
2008, Darren Breslin, East London, England
2009, Padraig King, County Limerick
2010, Conor Moriarty, County Kerry
2011, Vanessa Millar, County Clare
2012, Martin O'Connell, County Kerry/Laois
2013, Christopher Maguire, County Fermanagh
2014, Michael Curran, County Tyrone
2015, Daithí Gormley, County Sligo
2016, Uinseann Ó Murchú, County Wexford
2017, Colm Slattery, County Tipperary
2018, John McCann, County Fermanagh
2019, Seamus Tiernan, County Mayo
2022, Keelan McGrath, County Tipperary

Flute (Feadóg Mhór)

1951, Paddy Treacy, County Galway
1952, Paddy Treacy, County Galway
1953, Vincent Broderick, County Galway
1954, Ned Coleman, County Galway and Vincent Broderick, County Galway (tie) 
1955, Peter Broderick, County Galway
1956, Peadar O'Loughlin, County Clare
1957, Peadar O'Loughlin, County Clare
1958, P. J. Maloney, County Tipperary
1959, Michael Falsey, County Clare 
1960, Paddy Carty, County Galway
1961, Paddy Carty, County Galway
1962, Cathal McConnell, County Fermanagh
1963, Paddy Carty, County Galway
1964, Paddy Treacy, County Galway
1965, Séamus Tansey, County Sligo
1966, Matt Molloy, County Roscommon
1967, John Brady, County Offaly
1968, Mícheál Ó Halmhain, County Dublin
1969, Mícheál Ó Halmhain, County Dublin
1970, Billy Clifford, London
1971, P. O. Ceannabhain, County Galway
1972, Patsy Hanly, County Roscommon
1973, Eugene Nolan, County Laois
1974, Josie McDermott, County Sligo
1975, Deirdre Collis, County Sligo
1976, Peig McGrath Needham, County Roscommon
1977, Pat "Patsy" Moloney, County Limerick/Birmingham, England
1978, Tommy Guihan, County Roscommon
1979, Marcus Hernon, County Galway, and Leon Agnew, County Antrim (tie)
1980, Marcus Hernon, County Galway
1981, Michael Harty, County Tipperary
1982, Noel Sweeney, County Longford
1983, Paul Gallagher, Luton/London
1984, Siobhán O'Donnell, London
1985, Claire Burke, County Offaly
1986, Sharon McDermott, County Tyrone
1987, Pat Fitzpatrick, County Wexford
1988, Garry Shannon, County Clare
1989, Attracta Brady, County Offaly
1990, Thomas McElvogue, Leeds
1991, Sharon Burke, London
1992, Martin Glynn, County Clare
1993, Paul McGlinchey, County Tyrone
1994, Paul McGlinchey, County Tyrone
1995, Paul McGlinchey, County Tyrone
1996, Majella Bartley, County Monaghan
1997, Sandra Deegan, County Carlow
1998, June McCormack, County Sligo
1999, Tom O'Connor, County Kerry
2000, Sarah-Jane Woods, County Dublin
2001, Louise Mulcahy, County Limerick
2002, Isaac Alderson, Chicago
2003, Aoife Ní Ghrainbhil, County Kerry
2004, Michael Mac Conraí, County Limerick
2005, Siobhán Hogan, County Clare
2006, James Mahon, County Dublin
2007, Cian Kearins, County Sligo
2008, Stiofan Ó Dochartaigh (Stephen Doherty), County Mayo
2009, Cathy Jones, County Kilkenny
2010, Paraic Stapleton, County Tipperary
2011, Orlaith McAullife, London
2012, Tommy Fitzharris, County Laois
2013, Jillian Ní Mháille (O'Malley), County Mayo
2014, Siobhán Ní Uirc (Joanne Quirke), County Cork
2015, Cein Sweeney, County Cavan
2016, Séamus Tierney, County Cavan
2017, Tiernan Courell, County Sligo
2018, Tom Gavin, County Sligo
2019, Ciarán Mac Gearailt (FitzGerald), County Kildare
2022, Barry Conaty, County Cavan

Tin Whistle (Feadóg Stain)

1951, H. McGee, County Westmeath
1953, E. Maloney, County Galway
1954, T. Sheridan, County Cavan
1955, T. Sheridan, County Cavan
1956, S. O hAodha, County Clare
1957, M. O'Cleirig, County Clare and Matthew Lynch, County Cavan (Joint Result)
1958, M. MacEil, County Roscommon
1959, Martin Talty, County Clare
1960, Michael Falsey, County Clare
1961, Michael Falsey, County Clare
1962, Cathal McConnell, County Fermanagh
1964, Josie McDermott, County Sligo
1965, Michael O'Dwyer, London England / County Cork
1966, Josie McDermott, County Sligo
1967, Anne Sheehy, County Kerry
1968, Michael Graham, County Kildare
1969, Joe McKevitt, County Louth
1970, Mary Bergin, County Dublin
1971, Roy Galvin, County Dublin
1972, Deirdre Collis, County Sligo
1973, Micho Russell, County Clare
1974, Michael Gavin, County Dublin
1975, S. O’Riain, (Seán Ryan) County Tipperary.
1976, Father Charlie Coen, New York City
1977, Diarmuid O’Cionnaith, County Dublin
1978, County Galway
1979, Peter McAlinden, London, England
1980, Damhnait Nic Suibhne, County Donegal
1981, Liz King - Cassidy, County Wexford
1982, Maire. Ní Mhaonacgh, County Limerick
1983, Sean Smyth, County Mayo
1984, Joanie Madden, New York
1985, Padraig Donlon, County Longford
1986, Sharon McDermott, County Tyrone
1987, Sion Ní hAllmhuráin, County Clare
1988, Attracta Ní Bhradaigh, County Offaly
1989, Mary Jo Campbell, County Kildare
1990, Martina Bree, County Sligo
1991, Eleanor Carmody, County Kerry
1992, Colm O'Donnell, County Sligo
1993, Grace Kelly, Manchester, England
1994, Laurence Nugent, County Fermanagh
1995, Laurence Nugent, County Fermanagh
1996, Tríona Flavin, County Limerick
1997, Sandra Deegan, County Carlow
1998, Róisín Nic Dhonnacha, County Galway
1999, Emma O'Leary, County Kerry
2000, Mikie Smyth, County Dublin
2001, Louise Mulcahy, County Limerick
2002, Isaac Alderson, Chicago
2003, Emer Burke (Eimear De Burca), County Mayo
2004, Aidan O'Neill, County Tyrone
2005, Edward Looney, County Kerry
2006, Aisling McPhillips, County Fermanagh
2007, Cian Kearins, County Sligo
2008, Siobhan Ní Ógain (Siobhan Hogan), County Clare
2009, Yvonne Ward, County Leitrim
2010, Siobhán Ní Uirc (Joanne Quirke) County Cork
2011, Orlaith McAuliffe, London, England
2012, Seán Céitinn, County Cork
2013, Jillian Ní Mháille, County Mayo
2014, Yasmin Lynch, County Donegal
2015, James McCaffrey, County Tyrone
2016, Máire De Barra, County Mayo
2017, Seamus Ó Flatharta, County Galway
2018, Liam Ó Neadán, County Sligo
2019, Ciarán Mac Gearailt (FitzGerald), County Kildare
2022, Máire Ní Bhraonáin, County Offaly

Piano Accordion (Cáirdín Piano)

1964, Frank Kelly, County Roscommon
1965, Liam Gaul, Wexford
1966, K.Lawrie, Birmingham
1967, Liam Clarke, Dun Dealgon
1968, Mick Foster, Rathconrath
1969  K.Lawrie, Birmingham
1970, Mick Foster, Rathconrath
1971, Pat McCabe, Clones
1972, John Ferguson, Leeds
1973, John Ferguson, Leeds
1974, John Ferguson, Leeds
1975, Ann Morris, Boyle
1976, John Henry, County Londonderry
1977, Jimmy Keane, Chicago, USA
1978, Jimmy Keane, Chicago, USA
1979, John Gibney, Derby
1980, Mary Finn, Sligo
1981, Seamus Meehan, County Dublin
1982, Karen Tweed, Northampton
1983, Liam Roberts, County Dublin
1984, Noreen McQuaid, Monaghan
1985, Elaine McDermott, County Tyrone
1986, Collette O'Leary, Dublin
1987, Gearoid Ó hArgain (Ferard Horgan), County Cork
1988, Michael McDonagh, Luton
1989, Gerry Conlon, Glasgow
1990, Ger Maloney, Limerick
1991, Declan Payne, Sligo
1992, Michael Tennyson, Leeds
1993, Michael Tennyson, Leeds
1994, Michael Tennyson, Leeds
1995, Mirella Murray, Galway
1996, Andreas O Murchu, County Cork
1997, Marie Clarke, County Donegal
1998, Michelle O Leary, Manchester
1999, Michelle O Leary, Manchester
2000, Gearóid Mac Eogáin, County Monaghan
2001, Ann Mc Laughlin, County Donegal
2002, Colin McGill, County Laois
2003, Shane Ó hUaithne, County Galway
2004, David Nealon, County Galway
2005, Dean Warner, Leeds
2006, Amanda Ní Eochaidh, County Wexford
2007, Sinéad Healy, County Mayo
2008, Edel Mc Laughlin, County Donegal
2009, Caitríona Ní Choileáin, County Cork
2010, Seán Gavaghan, Leeds, Britain
2011, Seán Gavaghan, Leeds, Britain
2012, Adam Dyer, County Dublin
2013, Dónal Ó Coileáin, County Cork
2014, Kevin Murphy, Glasgow, Scotland
2015, Kevin Murphy, Glasgow, Scotland
2016, Kevin Murphy, Glasgow, Scotland
2017, Ryan Hackett, County Tyrone
2018, Rhianne Kelly, County Galway
2019, Fergal Bradley, County Donegal
2022, Shauneen Maguire, County Fermanagh

Concertina (Consairtín)

1956, Chris Droney, County Clare
1959, Chris Droney, County Clare
1960, Chris Droney, County Clare
1961, Chris Droney, County Clare
1962, Chris Droney, County Clare
1963, Chris Droney, County Clare
1964, Chris Droney, County Clare
1965, Chris Droney, County Clare
1966, Chris Droney, County Clare
1967, Chris Droney, County Clare
1968, Theresa White, County Waterford
1969, Tommy McMahon, County Clare
1970, Tommy McMahon, County Clare
1971, Tommy McMahon, County Clare
1975, Gerald Haugh, County Clare
1976, Father Charlie Coen, New York
1977, Father Charlie Coen, New York
1979, Mary MacNamara, County Clare
1981, D. Buckley, County Cork
1982 Gearóid Ó hAllmhuráin, County Clare
1983, Ciaran Burns, County Down
1984, Méabh Ní Lochlainn, Baile Átha Cliath
1985, Francis Droney, County Clare
1987, Paul Quinn, Camlough, Co. Armagh
1988, Elaine O'Sullivan, Coventry
1989, Johnny Williams, Chicago
1990, Micheal O'Raghallaigh, County Meath
199X, Michael Rooney, County Monaghan
199X, Maura Walsh, County Kerry
1994, Grainne Hambly, County Mayo
1996, Antóin O Conaill, County Limerick
1997, Ernestine Ni Ealal, County Mayo
1998, Maedhbh Scahill, County Galway
1999, Séamus Ó Mongáin, County Mayo
2000, Triona Ní Aodha, County Kerry
2001, Triona Ní Aodha, County Kerry
2002, Hugh Healy, County Clare
2003, Holly NicOireachtaigh, County Mayo
2004, Aidan O'Neill, County Tyrone
2005, Alan Egan, County Kerry
2006, Máiréad Ní Uirthuile, County Sligo
2007, Rory McMahon, County Clare
2008, Aoife Ní Uaithne, County Galway
2009, Tomás Fitzharris, County Laois
2010, Breda Shannon, County Roscommon
2011, Aoibheann Murphy, County Cork
2012, Niamh Ní Shúilleabháin, County Dublin
2013, Róisín Ní Bhrudair, County Galway
2014, Ciaran Hanna, County Tyrone
2015, Paul Clesham, County Mayo
2016, Sinéad Mulqueen, County Clare
2017, Ciarán FitzGerald (Ciarán Mac Gearailt), County Kildare
2018, Sarán Mulligan, County Louth
2019, Aileen de Búrca, County Mayo
2022, Aidan Quigney, County Clare

Uilleann Pipes (Píb Uilleann)

1951, Willie Clancy, County Clare 
1952, Willie Reynolds, County Westmeath and John McAloon, County Fermanagh (tie) 
1953, Willie Clancy, Co. Dublin
1954, Michael Padian, County Monaghan 
1955, Dan Cleary, County Offaly
1956, Dan Cleary, County Offaly
1957, Dan Cleary, County Offaly
1958, Pat McNulty, Glasgow, Scotland (formerly of County Donegal)*1965, Michael Falsey, County Clare
1964, Liam O'Flynn Fleadh Cheoil na hÉireann Clones
1966, Finbar Furey
196?, Tomás Ó Ceannabháin, County Galway
1973, Tom Walsh, Preston, Lancashire
1974, Gabriel McKeon, County Dublin
1975, Finbar McLaughlin, City of Derry
1976, Trevor Stewart, County Antrim
1977, Joseph McHugh, City of Derry
1979, Brian Stafford, City of Derry
1981, D. Buckley
1980, Mattie Connolly, County Monaghan/New York
1982, Seamus Meehan, Dublin
1983, Michael Cooney, County Tipperary
1984, Fergus Finnegan, County Dublin
1985, Fergus Finnegan, County Dublin
1986, Eamonn Walsh, Ballina, County Mayo
1987, Martin Frain, Sheffield, UK
1990, Brendan Ring, London
1991, Tiarnán Ó Duinchinn, County Monaghan
1992, David Power, County Waterford
1993, Brian Mac Aodha, County Leitrim.
1996, Brian Krause, County Galway
1997, Flaithrí Neff, County Cork
1998, David Kinsella, County Offaly
1999, Audrey Cunningham, County Wicklow
2000, Mikie Smyth, County Dublin
2001, Louise Mulcahy, County Limerick
2002, Isaac Alderson, Chicago
2003, Martin Crossin, County Donegal
2004, Richard Murray, County Galway
2005, James Mahon, County Dublin
2006, Éanna Ó Cróinín, County Meath
2007, Seán McCarthy, County Cork
2008, Fiachra Ó Riagáin, County Galway
2009, Martino Vacca, County Limerick
2010, Richard Neylon, County Galway
2011, Éanna Ó Chróinín, County Meath
2012, Seán Céitinn, County Cork
2013, Conor Mallon, County Armagh
2014, Cathal Ó Crócaigh, County Dublin
2015, Tara Howley, County Clare
2016, Fionn Morrison, County Dublin
2017, Eoin Orr, County Donegal
2018, Timmy Flaherty, CCÉ, Ballylongford / Tarbert, Ciarraí
2019, Ruairí Howell, County Down
2022, Peter McKenna, County Tyrone

Harp (Cruit)
1974, Deirdre Danaher, New York City, USA
1975, Maire Ni Chathasaigh, County Cork
1976, Maire Ni Chathasaigh, County Cork
1977, Maire Ni Chathasaigh, County Cork
1979, Patricia Daly, County Armagh
1980, Sylvia Woods, California, USA
1981, Janet Harbison, County Dublin
1982, Mairéad Ní Chathasaigh, County Cork
1983, Celia Joyce, Preston, Lancashire, England
1984,  Shawna Culotta, California, USA
1985, Kathleen Guilday, Boston, USA
1986, Martha Clancy, Philadelphia, USA
1987, Eimear Ní Bhroin, County Cork
1989, Tracey Fleming, County Roscommon
1990, Cormac de Barra, County Dublin
1992, Laoise Ní Cheallaigh (Laoise Kelly), County Mayo
1993, Michael Rooney, County Monaghan
1994, Gráinne Hambly, County Mayo
1996, Padraigín Caesar, County Carlow
1997, Áine Heneghan, County Mayo
1998, Barbra Doyle, County Kildare
1999, Freda Nic Ghiolla Chathain, County Westmeath
2000, Eileen Gannon, St. Louis
2001, Holly Nic Oireachtaigh, County Mayo
2002, Nicola Ní Chathail, County Galway
2003, Fionnuala Ní Ruanaidh, County Monaghan
2004, Méabh de Buitléir, County Clare
2005, Seana Ní Dhaithí, County Meath
2006, Lucy Kerr, City of Derry
2007, Aedin Martin, County Dublin
2008, Lisa Ní Cheannaigh (Lisa Canny), County Mayo
2009, Oisín Morrisson. County Dublin
2010, AnnaLee Foster, Oregon, USA
2011, Aoife Ní Argáin, County Dublin
2012, Alisha McMahon, County Clare
2013, Áine Ní Shiocháin, County Limerick
2014, Eimear Coughlan, County Clare
2015, Gráinne Nic Ghiobúin, County Limerick
2016, Niamh McGloin, County Sligo
2017, Seamus Ó Flatharta, County Galway
2018, Síofra Hanley, County Sligo
2019, Fionnuala Donlon, County Louth
2022, Emma Benson, County Roscommon

Mouth Organ (Orgán Béil)

1966, Thomas McGovern, County Leitrim
1969, Phil Murphy, County Wexford
1970, Phil Murphy, County Wexford
1971, Phil Murphy, County Wexford
1973, John Murphy, County Wexford
1975, Rick Epping, USA
1976, Gerard Danaher, County Sligo
1977, Mary Brogan, County Wexford
1979, Kieran McHugh, County Antrim
198?, Pip Murphy, County Wexford (twice)
1981, P. J. Gannon, St. Louis, USA
1983, Mick Furlong, County Wexford
1984, Nicky Furlong, Wexford
1985, Noel Battle, County Westmeath
1987, Don Meade, New York, USA
1993, Brendan Power, New Zealand
1996, Austin Berry, County Roscommon
1997, Austin Berry, County Roscommon
1998, Austin Berry, County Roscommon
1999, Tomás Ó Tuathail, County Mayo
2000, Paul Moran, County Galway
2001, Noel Battle, County Westmeath
2002, Noel Battle, County Westmeath
2003, Noel Battle, County Westmeath
2004, Noel Battle, County Westmeath
2005, Edward Looney, County Kerry
2006, Pauline Callinan, County Clare
2007, Nollaig Mac Concatha, County Meath
2008, Pat Casey, County Tyrone
2009, Pat Casey, County Tyrone
2010, Pat Casey, County Tyrone
2011, Orla Ward, County Leitrim
2012, Poilín Ní Ghabháin (Pauline Callinan), County Clare
2013, John Horkan, County Mayo
2014, John Horkan, County Mayo
2015, Denis Nolan, County Wexford
2016, John Horkan, County Mayo
2017, Pat Fulton, County Offaly
2018, John Horkan, County Mayo
2019, Arlene O'Sullivan, County Clare
2022, Liam MacThómais, County Tipperary

Banjo (Bainseo)

1971, Mick O'Connor, London
1974, Owen Hackett, County Meath
1975, S. O’Hagen, County Tyrone
1976, Tony "Sully" Sullivan, Manchester
1977, Kieran Hanrahan, County Clare
1978, James (Kevin) Shanahan, London
1979, Willie Kavanagh, County Longford
1981, John Hogan, Arklow County Wicklow, (Gorey CCE)
1982, John Carty, London
1983, Cathal Hayden, County Tyrone
1984, Cathal Hayden, County Tyrone
1985, Noel Birmingham, County Clare
1987, Tomas Ó Maoilean, County Galway
1988, Pat Bass, County Wexford
1990, Lorraine Ely, Luton
1991, Pat Bass, County Wexford
1992, Pat Bass, County Wexford 
1993, Joe Molloy, Birmingham
1994, John Morrow, County Leitrim
1995, Theresa O'Grady, Luton
1996, Paul Meehan, County Armagh
1997, Brian Fitzgerald, County Limerick
1998, Colm O hUaithnin, County Tipperary
1999, Brian Kelly, Birmingham
2000, Kerri Ní Oireachtaigh, County Sligo
2001, Alan Byrne, County Dublin
2002, Kieran Fletcher, County Armagh
2003, Clíodhna Ní Choisdealbha, County Tipperary
2004, Aisling Neville, County Kerry
2005, Éamonn Ó Murchú, County Cork
2006, Shane McDermott, County Fermanagh 
2007, Gearóid Céitinn, County Limerick
2008, Steven Madden, County Clare
2009, Eoin O'Sullivan, County Limerick
2010, Eimear Howley, County Clare
2011, Dermot Mulholland, City of Derry
2012, Con Mahon, County Offaly
2013, Tomas Quinn, County Tyrone
2014, Elaine Reilly, County Longford
2015, George McAdam, County Monaghan
2016, Gearoid Curtin, County Kerry
2017, Brian Scannell, County Limerick
2018, Dean Ó Gríofa, County Kerry
2019, Shane Scanlon, County Cork
2022, Thomas Ahern, County Waterford

Mandolin (Maindilín)

1979, Séamus Egan, Pennsylvania
1980, Stephen Daly, Dublin
1989, Stephen Daly, Dublin
1990, Terence Matthews, Co. Kerry
1991, Pat Bass, Co. Wexford
1992, Pat Bass, Co. Wexford 
1994, John Morrow, County Leitrim
1995, Sean Marshall, County Longford
1996, Brian Carolan, County Meath
1997, Brian Kelly, London
1998, Colm O hUaithnin, County Tipperary
1999, Kate Marquis, County Monaghan
2000, Kate Marquis, County Monaghan
2001, Daithí Ó Cearnaigh, County Kerry
2002, Shane Mulchrone, County Mayo
2003, Piaras MacEochagáin, County Kerry
2004, Alan Tierney, County Galway
2005, Aaron Mc Sorley, County Tyrone
2006, Frances Donahue, County Cork
2007, Michael Gaughan, West London
2008, Eimear Ní hAmhlaigh, County Clare
2009, Ryan McCourt, County Antrim
2010, Gavin Strappe, County Tipperary
2011, Sandra Walsh, County Cork
2012, Séamus Ó Ciarba, County Clare
2013, Danny Collins, County Cork
2014, Elaine Reilly, County Longford 
2015, George McAdam, County Monaghan
2016, Richie Delahunty, County Tipperary
2017, Darragh Carey Kennedy, County Tipperary
2018, Oisin Murphy, County Monaghan
2019, Shane Scanlon, County Cork
2022, Tiarnán O'Connell, County Dublin

Piano (Piano)1969, Declan Foley, Waterford City
1960, Brendan Gaughran, County Louth
1961, Brendan Gaughran, County Louth
1962, Brendan Gaughran, County Louth
1972, James McCorry, County Armagh
1974, Liam Reilly, County Louth
1975, K.Taylor, London, Britain
1976, Mary Corcoran, County Dublin
1977, Geraldine Cotter, County Clare
1979, Mary McNamara, County Clare
1980, Seamus O'Sullivan, Glasgow, Scotland
1983, Carol Talty, County Clare
1984, Gerry Conlon, Glasgow
1985, Brendan Moran, Leigh, Greater Manchester, UK
1986, Gerry Conlon, Glasgow, Scotland
1987, Nora Byrne, County Wexford
1989, Gerry Conlon, Glasgow, Scotland
1990, Seamus O'Sullivan, Glasgow, Scotland
1991, Caroline Ní Mhurchú, County Cork 
1995, Adrian Scahill, County Galway
1996, Aindreas O Murchú, County Cork
1997, Caitriona Cullivan, County Cavan
1998, Padraig O Reilly, County Clare
1999, Caitriona Cullivan, County Cavan
2000, Ita Cunningham, County Galway
2001, Paul Ryan, County Tipperary
2002, Mary McMahon, County Galway
2003, Adele Farrell, Manchester
2004, David Nealon, County Galway
2005, Caitríona Cullivan, County Cavan
2005, David Nealon, County Galway
2006, Aidan O’Neill, County Tyrone
2007, Amanda Nic Eochaidh, County Wexford
2008, Amanda Nic Eochaidh, County Wexford
2009, Déirdre O Reilly, County Cavan
2010, Gearóid Mac Giollarnáth, County Galway
2011, Adam Dyer, County Dublin
2012, Tadhg Ó Meachair, County Dublin
2013, Edel McLaughlin, County Donegal
2014, Connor Kiernan, County Cavan
2015, Mark Mac Criostail, County Tyrone
2016, David Browne, Glasgow, Scotland
2017, Rebecca McCarthy Kent, County Waterford
2018, James Hogan, County Offaly
2019, Hannah Collins, County Cork
2022, Barry Conaty, County Cavan

Melodeon (Mileoideon)

1981, Sean Norman, Co Offaly
1982, John Bass, Co. Wexford 
1983, Brendan Begley, County Dublin
1984, Johnny Bass, Co. Wexford
1985, Padraig O Coill, County Wexford
1986, Caroline Judge, St. Albans
1987, Diarmuid Ó Cathain, County Kerry
1988, John Bass, Co. Wexford
1993, Martin Hickey, County Offaly
1995, Oliver Diviney, County Galway
1996, Oliver Diviney, County Galway
1997, Peadar Mac Eli, County Mayo
1998, Oliver Diviney, County Galway
1999, Sean Bass, County Wexford
2000, Sharon Ní Chearbhall, County Offaly
2001, Caitríona O'Brien, County Wicklow
2002, Caitríona O'Brien, County Wicklow
2003, Caitríona O'Brien, County Wicklow 
2004, Niamh Brett, County Roscommon
2005, Damien Mullane, West London, England
2006, Daire Mulhern, County Clare
2007, Noel Clancy, County Waterford
2008, Christopher Maguire, County Fermanagh
2009, Connor Moriarty, County Kerry
2010, Damien McGuiness, County Sligo
2011, Seán Ó Maoilmhíchíl, County Limerick
2012, Aonghus Ó Maicín, County Mayo
2013, Dónal Ó Linneacháin, County Cork
2014, Caoimhe Millar, County Clare
2016, Diarmuid O' Meachair, County Cork
2017, Seamus Tiernan, County Mayo
2018, Colm Slattery, County Tipperary
2019, Steven O Leary, County Kerry
2022, Liam Browne, County Clare

Miscellaneous (Rogha Ghleas)

1971, Mike O'Connor, UK;
1975, S. Epping, County Xxxxx
1976, Joe Noonan, County Limerick
1977, Tomas O’Cinneide, County Tipperary
1979, Seamus Logan, County Antrim
1983, Jim Egan, County Tipperary
1984, David Mc Nevin, Dublin
1985, Colman Nugent, County Waterford
1987, Karen Tweed, London
1989, David James, South Bend, Indiana, USA
1992, Paul McGlinchey, County Tyrone
1993, Brendan Power, New Zealand
1994, John Morrow, County Leitrim
1995, Dawn Doherty, County Mayo
1996, Majella Bartley, County Monaghan
1997, Trudy O Donnell, County Donegal
1998, Caitriona Ni Chlochassaigh, County Limerick
1999, Seán Ó Murchú, County Mayo
2000, Séan Bass, County Wexford
2001, Aishling McPhillips, County Fermanagh
2002, David James, South Bend, Indiana
2003, Pat O’Donnell, County Limerick
2004, Fionnbarra Mac Riabhaigh, County Roscommon
2005, Edward Looney, County Kerry
2006, Pádraig Mac Giolla Phádraig, County Wexford
2007, Billy Dowling, County Offaly
2008, Eimear Ní hAmhlaigh, County Clare
2009, Tara Breen, County Clare
2010, Gavin Strappe, County Tipperary
2011, Arthur O'Connor, County Offaly
2012, Jens Kommnick, Germany
2013, Eimer Arkins, County Clare
2014, Alan Finn, County Cork
2015, Daniel Delaney, County Kilkenny
2016, Richie Delahunty, County Tipperary
2017, Tadhg Mulligan, County Louth
2018, Claire Ann Kearns, County Offaly
2019, Darragh Carey Kennedy, County Tipperary
2022, Sarah O'Gorman, County Waterford

Accompaniment (Tionlacán)

1994, Adrian Scahill, County Galway
1995, Michael Rooney, County Monaghan
1996, Verena Commins, Leeds CCE
1997, Kevin Brehony, County Sligo
1998, Annmarie Acosta, United States
1999, Aisling Ní Choisdealbha, Tipperary
2000, Séan Farrell, County Limerick
2001, Marta Cook, Chicago, USA
2002, Michael O'Rourke, County Clare
2003, Marie Walsh, County Galway
2004, Johnny Berrill, County Galway
2005, Paul McMahon, County Louth
2006, Stiofán Ó Marchaim, County Limerick
2007, Caruilín Ní Shúilleabháin, County Wexford
2008, Cathy Potter, County Antrim
2009, Joshua Dukes, Silver Spring, Maryland, USA
2010, Ronan Warnock, County Tyrone
2011, Elvie Miller, County Clare
2012, Jens Kommnick, Germany
2013, Catherine McHugh, County Galway
2014, Marc Mac Criostail, County Tyrone
2015, Paul Clesham, County Mayo
2016, Sinead Mulqueen, County Clare
2017, David Browne, Glasgow, Scotland
2018, Jack Warnock, City of Derry
2019, Eddie Kiely, County Cork
2022, Ryan Ward, New York, USA

Bodhran (Bodhrán)

1973, John O'Dwyer, Leeds
1975, Johnny McDonagh, County Galway
1976, Tommy Hayes, County Limerick
1977, Gerry Enright, County Limerick
1979, Vincent Short, Lancashire
1981 Michael Lawler, County Wexford 
1982, Padhraic Egan, County Dublin
1983, Michael Lawler, County Wexford
1984, Michael Lawler County Wexford
1985, Maurice Griffin, County Tipperary
1986, Fabian Ó Murchu, County Cork
1987, Fabian Ó Murchu, County Cork
1988  Máirtín Mac Aodha, (Glasgow)
1989, Fabian Ó Murphy, County Cork
1990  Martin Meehan (12-15), County Armagh
1992 Máirtín Mac Aodha, (Glasgow)
1994  Martin Saunders, County Carlow
1995, Mark Maguire, Glasgow, Scotland
1996, Junior Davey, County Sligo
1997, Junior Davey, County Sligo
1998, Peter O Brien, London
1999, Aindrias Mac Dáibhí, County Sligo
2000, Séan Ó Dulaing, County Kilkenny
2001, Ciarán Leahy, County Cork
2002, Martin O'Neill, Glasgow
2003, Paul Phillips, County Down
2004, Serena Curley, County Galway
2005, Siobhan O’ Donnell, County Sligo
2006, Séan O’Neill, County Down
2007, Sinead Curley, County Galway
2008, Robbie Walsh, County Dublin
2009, Máirtín Mac Aodha. County Offaly
2010, Niall Preston, County Dublin
2011, Kieran Leonard, County Fermanagh
2012, Paul McClure, County Donegal
2013, Conor Mairtin, County Meath
2014, Dale McKay, County Laois
2015, Danny Collins, County Cork
2016, Sean O' Neill, County Down
2017, James O’Connor, County Limerick
2018, Niamh Fennell, County Waterford
2019, James O'Connor, County Limerick
2022, Daire Smith, County Cavan

Céilí Band Drummer (Drumaí Céilí)

1974, Gerarde Dawe, County Louth
1975, A. Vaughan, County Clare
1976, Donal O’Connor, County Sligo
1977, Billy Dwyer, County Wexford
1979, Billy Dwyer, County Wexford
1983, Micheal Heir, County Clare
1985, Debbie Conneely, Manchester
1987, Mark Maguire, Glasgow, Scotland
1995, Mark Maguire, Glasgow, Scotland
1996, Brian Walsh, County Monaghan
1997, Brian Walsh, County Monaghan
1998, Darragh Kelly, County Sligo
1999, Aidan Flood, County Longford
2000, Brian Breathnach, County Monaghan
2001, Aidan Flood, County Longford
2002, Kevin O'Neill, Glasgow
2003, Aidan Flood, County Longford
2004, Brian Walsh, County Monaghan
2005, Martin Murphy, County Longford
2006, Darragh Kelly, County Sligo
2007, Seán Ó Broin, County Waterford
2008, Charline Brady, County Fermanagh
2009, Charline Brady, County Fermanagh
2010, Pádraig Ó Maolcathaigh, County Limerick
2011, Kieran Leonard, County Fermanagh
2012, Damien McGuinness, County Sligo
2013, Brian Walsh, County Monaghan
2014, Brian Walsh, County Monaghan
2015, Jason McGuinness, County Sligo
2016, Eoghan Mac Giollachroist, County Longford
2017, Michael Sheridan, County Sligo
2018, Conor Moore, County Wexford
2019, Conor Hartnett, County Tipperary
2022, Mark Vesey, County Laois

War Pipes (Piob Mhór)

1953 P. Ó Gregain, County Dublin 
1955 Francis Vaughan, County Clare
1973 Denis Nagle, County Kerry
1974, Michael O’Malley, London
1975, Michael O’Malley, London
1976, Michael O’Malley, London
1977, Br. Vincent, County Sligo
1979, James Finnegan, London
1983, Rory Somers, County Mayo
1984, Larry O Dowd, Sligo
1985, Sarah Fitzpatrick, County Wexford
1987, Denis O'Reilly, County Kerry
1993, Shane O'Neill, County Tyrone
1996, Danny Houlihan, County Kerry
1997, Danny Houlihan, County Kerry
1998, Martin McAndrew, Chicago
1999, Danny Houlihan, County Kerry
2000, Danny Houlihan, County Kerry
2001, Danny Houlihan, County Kerry
2002, Danny Houlihan, County Kerry
2004, Greg Robbin, London
2005, Conal McNamara, County Galway
2006, Rachel Corr, County Tyrone
2007, No Competitors
2008, Lisa Farber, New Jersey, USA
2009, Lisa Farber, New Jersey, USA
2010, David Stone, County Waterford

Fiddle - Slow Airs (Fidil/Veidhlín - Foinn Mhalla)

1975, P. Ó Coill, County Xxxxx
1976, Ann O'Brien, County Antrim
1977, Nollaig Ní Chathasaigh, County Cork
1979, John O'Sullivan, County Kilkenny
1981. Tommy McGoldrick, County Antrim
1983, Frances Nesbitt, County Tipperary
1984, Frances Nesbitt, County Tipperary
1985, Frances Nesbitt, County Tipperary
1986, Timmy O'Shea, County Kerry
1987, Michael Ó hÉineacháin, County Mayo
1988, Colm Crummey, County Antrim
1992, Brenda McCann, County Fermanagh
1993, Joseph Toolan, County Dublin
1994, Alice Wickham, County Wexford
1995, Maria Gleeson, County Limerick 
1996, Kieran Convery, County Antrim
1997, Breda Keville, Leeds, UK
1998, Lisa Ní Choisdealbha, County Tipperary
1999, Emma O' Leary, County Kerry
2000, Tomás Mac Aogáin, County Wexford
2001, Cathal Ó Clochasaigh, County Limerick
2002, Eleanor Keane, Glasgow, Scotland
2003, Kira Jewett, New Jersey, USA
2004, Clár Ní Chuinn, County Tipperary
2005, Marion Collins, County Cork
2006, Pádraig Creedon, County Kerry
2007, Niall McClean, County Down
2008, Áine Sinéad Ní Riain (Anna Jane Ryan), County Limerick
2009, Tara Breen, County Clare
2010, Courtney Cullen, County Wicklow
2011, Lydia Warnock, County Leitrim
2012, Clár Breathnach, County Dublin
2013, Caitríona Ní Luasa, County Cork
2014, Donál Ó Beoláin, County Westmeath
2015, Lucia Mac Partlin, County Tipperary
2016, Éadaoin Ní Mhaicín, County Mayo
2017, Jake James, New York, USA
2018, Jason McGuinness, County Sligo
2019, Sarah O'Gorman, County Waterford
2022, Una McGlinchey, County Tyrone

Uilleann Pipes - Slow Airs (Píb Uilleann - Foinn Mhalla)

1985, Eamonn Walsh, County Mayo
1975, Seamus Casey, London
1976, Seamus Casey, London
1977, (only 1 competitor)
1979, Gearóid Ó hAllmhuráin, County Clare
1983, Brian McComb, Blackburn, Lancashire, England
1984, Eamonn Walsh, Dublin
1985, Brian McNamara, County Leitrim
1986, Andrew Murphy, Poulton-le-fylde, Lancashire, England
1987, Mark Donnelly (Deceased), County Armagh
1991, Tommy Martin, County Dublin
1992, Patrick Hutchinson, USA
1993, Brian Mac Aodha, Co. Leitrim.
1996, Máire de Cogáin, County Cork
1997, Flaithrí Neff, County Cork
1998, Sean Ryan, USA
1999, Audrey Cunningham, County Wicklow
2000, Mikie Smyth, County Dublin
2001, Louise Mulcahy, County Limerick
2002, Isaac Alderson, Chicago
2003, Sinéad O'Shiel Flemming, County Laois
2004, Richard Murray, County Galway
2005, James Mahon, County Dublin
2006, Éanna Ó Cróinín, County Galway
2007, Seán McCarthy, County Cork
2008, Fiachra Ó Riagáin, County Galway
2009, Martino Vacca, County Limerick
2010, Richard Neylon, County Galway
2011, Éanna Ó Cróinín, County Meath
2012, Seán Céitinn, County Cork
2013, Torrin Ryan, Massachusetts, USA
2014, Patrick Hutchinson, Massachusetts, USA
2015, Tara Howley, County Clare
2016, Siobhán Hogan, County Galway
2017, Conall Duffy, County Louth
2018, Conor Murphy, County Dublin
2019, Eoin Orr, County Donegal
2022, Alain Ó Cearúil, County Laois

Flute - Slow Airs (Feadóg Mhór - Foinn Mhalla)

1975, John Lewis, County Galway
1976, Ann O’Brien, County Antrim??
1977, Des Leech, County Dublin
1979, Páraic Ó Lochlainn, County Dublin
1980, Damhnait Nic Suibhne, County Donegal
1981  Neansaí Ní Choisdealbha, County Galway
1983, Meadhbh Ní Lochlainn, County Dublin
1984, Tom Hanafin, County Kerry
1985, Julia Nicholas, St. Helens, Merseyside, UK
1987, Kathleen Ford, County Donegal
1988, Michael Griffin, County Wexford
1991, Paul McGlinchey, County Tyrone
1995, Maureen Shannon, USA
1996, Fiona Butler, County Kilkenny
1997, Catriona Ni Chlochasaigh, County Limerick
1998, Aoife Ni Ghrainbhil, County Kerry
1999, Ciaran McGuinness, County Longford
2000, Attracta Brady, County Offaly
2001, Áine Ní Dhé, County Kerry
2002, Seacailín Ní Ealaithe, County Limerick
2003, Maidhc Ó hÉanaigh, Co. na Gaillimhe
2004, Frances Donahue, County Galway
2005, Richard Neylon, County Galway
2006, Sinéad Fahey, County Waterford
2007, Christina Dolphin, County Dublin
2008, Audrey Ní Murchú, County Westmeath
2009, Matthew Dean, Villa Real, Castellan, Spain
2010, Breda Shannon, County Roscommon
2011, Eibhlís Ní Shúilleabháin, County Cork
2012, Órlaith McAuliffe, London, England
2013, Jillian Ní Mháille, County Mayo
2014, Máiréad Ní Chiaraigh, County Cork
2015, Maura O'Brien, County Tipperary
2016, Cailín O'Shea, County Kerry
2017, Ciarán FitzGerald (Ciarán Mac Gearailt), County Kildare.
2018, Claire Fennell, County Waterford
2019, Conor Maheady, County Mayo
2022, Donnchadh Mac Aodha, County Louth

Tin Whistle - Slow Airs (Feadóg Stain - Foinn MhaIla)

1975, Willis Patton, County Antrim
1976, Carmel Gunning, County Sligo
1977, Kevin Whitty, County Wexford
1979, Chalmers Brown, County Down
1983, Mairéad Ní Chathasaigh, County Cork
1984, Tom Hanafin, County Kerry
1985, Michel Sikiotakis, Paris, France
1993, Maggie McCarty, County Limerick
1994, Maggie McCarty, County Limerick
1995, Maggie McCarty, County Limerick
1996, Fiona Butler, County Kilkenny
1997, Majella Bartley, County Monaghan
1998, Róisín Nic Dhonnacha, County Galway
1989, Lorraine Mc Mahon, County Louth
1999, Emma O'Leary, County Kerry
2000, Caitríona Ní Mhaoldomhnaigh, County Limerick
2001, Noreen Ní Mhurchú, County Cork
2002, Sacra Ní Fhuardha, County Galway
2003, Linda Ní Bheirn, County Roscommon
2004, Sinéad Fahy, County Waterford
2005, Julie Ann McCafferty, County Fermanagh
2006, Fiachra Ó Riagáin, County Galway
2007, Pól Ó Rúis, County Roscommon
2008, Edel McLaughlin, County Donegal
2009, Audrey Murphy, County Westmeath
2010, Audrey Murphy, County Westmeath
2011, Siobhan Ni Uirc (Joanne Quirke) County Cork
2012, Audrey Ní Mhurcú, County Westmeath
2013, Yasmin Lynch, County Donegal
2014, Maura Ní Bhriain, County Tipperary
2015, Siobhán Ní Chonchuirr, County Donegal
2016, Ciarán FitzGerald (Ciarán Mac Gearailt), County Kildare
2017, Cárl Ó' Dochartaigh, (Karl Doherty), County Donegal
2018, Brendan Rowan, County Meath
2019, Padraig Enright, County Kerry
2022, Grainne Ní Mhuineog, County Offaly

Harp - Slow Airs (Cruit - Foinn Mhalla)

2011, Déirdre Ní Ghrainbhil, County Kerry
2012, Fiana Ní Chonaill, County Limerick
2013, Emily Gaine, County Sligo
2014, Eimear Coughlan, County Clare
2015, Siobhán Ní Bhuachalla, County Cork
2016, Kerri Ní Mhaoláin, (Kerri Mullan) City of Derry
2017, Seamus O Flatharta, County Galway
2018, Una Ní Fhlannagáin, County Galway
2019, Siofra Thornton, County Tipperary
2022, Éilís Ní Néadáin, County Sligo

Duets (Ceol Beirte)

1952, Michael Brophy and Joseph Ryan, County Dublin
1953, Paddy O'Brien and Bridie Lafferty
1955, James Rooney & Sean McAloon, County Fermanagh
1956, Seán Ryan & P. J. Moloney, County Tipperary
1962, Joe Burke & Aggie Whyte, County Galway
1977, Sean McGlynn & Brendan Mulvihill, Washington D.C.
1975, Jimmy Keane & Liz Carroll, Chicago
1976, John and Eileen Brady, County Offaly
1977, Billy McComiskey & Brendan Mulvihill, New York
1979, Martin Hayes & Mary McNamara, County Clare
1983, Sean & Breda Smyth, County Mayo
1984, Rose Daly & Sean O Dalaigh Offaly & Dublin
1985, E. Minogue & M. Cooney, County Tipperary
1986, Rose Daly & Sean o Dalaigh Offaly & Dublin
1987, Joanie Madden & Kathy McGinty, New York
1988, Michael & Chris McDonagh, Luton, UK
1989, PJ Hernon & Philip Duffy, County Sligo
1990, Elizabeth Gaughan & Michael Tennyson, Leeds
1991, Micheal & MacDara O'Reily, Meath
1992, Micheal & MacDara O'Reily, Meath
1993, Paul McGlinchey & Barry McLaughlin, Tyrone
1994, Anthony Quigney & Aiden McMahon, Clare
1995, Mirella Murray & Liz Kane, County Galway
1996, Ursula & Clare Byrne, County Down
1997, Aisling & Alan O Choisdeabha, County Tipperary
1998, Antoin O Connaill & Diarmuid O Brien, County Limerick
1999, Cathal & C. Ní Chlochasaigh, County Limerick
2000, Loretto Ní Mhaoldomhnaigh & Thomas Slattery, County Tipperary
2001, Nuala Hehir & Liz Gaughan, County Clare
2002, Sharon Ní Chearbhaill & Attracta Brady, County Offaly
2003, Seana & Lorna Ní Dhaithí, County Meath
2004, Úna Devlin & Paul Quinn, County Armagh
2005, Mairéad McManus & Katie Boyle, Glasgow
2006, Aisling Neville & Alan Egan, County Kerry
2007, Tara Breen & Cathal Mac an Rí, County Clare
2008, Sean & Gearoid Ó Cathain, County Kildare
2009, Daragh & Micheál Ó hÉalaí, County Mayo
2010, Alan Finn & Rory McMahon, County Cork
2011, Lottie & Courtney Cullen, County Wicklow
2012, Seacailín & Eibhlín Ní Éalaithe, County Limerick
2013, Rory Healy & John Bass, County Wicklow
2014, Orlaith McAuliffe & Brogan McAuliffe, London, England
2015, Patricia McArdle & Róisín Anne Hughes, Glasgow, Scotland
2016, Anne Marie Bell & Megan Duffy, County Sligo
2017, Tadhg & Saran Mulligan, County Louth
2018, Áine & Ciarán Mac Gearailt (FitzGerald), County Kildare
2019, Jason & Damien McGuiness, County Sligo
2022, Ellen O'Gorman & Joseph Mannion, County Waterford

Trios (Ceol Trír)

1952, Paddy Brophy, Mick Brophy and Joe Ryan, County Dublin
1960, Larry Redican, Jack Coen, Paddy O'Brien
1967, Joe Burke, Kathleen Collins & Carl Hession
1974, Eugene Nolan, Denis Ryan & Ellen Flanagan, County Kildare
1975, Eugene Nolan, Denis Ryan & Ellen Flanagan, County Kildare
1976, Collis Trio, County Sligo
1977, O’Brien, Fogarty & Harty Trio, County Tipperary
1979, M. Harty, E.O'Brien & W. Fogarty, County Tipperary
1983, M. Nugent, J Nugent & M. Carroll, County Clare
1984, L.Gaul, S.Rattigan, D.Robinson, Co. Wexford
1985, Cathrine, Anne & Fiona McEnroe, County Cavan
1987, J. Lawlor, J. & E. Kennedy, Luton, UK
1988, Mary O'Connell, Michael & Christopher McDonagh, Luton, UK
1989, Michael Hurley, P. J. Hernon & Philip Duffy, County Sligo,
1991, Thomas, John & Robert Morrow, County Leitrim
1992, Michael, MacDara, & Felim O'Reily, Meath
1994, Michael Tennyson, Liz Gaughan & Maureen Ferguson, Leeds
1995, Claire Griffin, Anthony Quigney & Aiden McMahon, Co. Clare
1996, Seán, Mairín & Caitríona O Clochasaigh, County Limerick
1997, Darragh Pattwell, Alan & Aisling Coisdealbha, County Tipperary
1998, John & Jacinta McEvoy, Patsy Moloney, Birmingham
1999, Tomás Keegan, Pat Bass & John Bass, County Wexford
2000, Cathal, Mairín & Cáit Clohessey, County Limerick
2001, Nual Hehir, Liz Gaughan & B. Quinn, County Clare
2002, Carmel Doohan, Clive Earley, Ciara O'Sullivan, County Clare
2003, Fionnuala Ní Ruanaidh, Thomas Johnson, Laura Ní Bheagain, County Monaghan
2004, John Burke, Carmel Burke & Siobhán Ní Chonaráin, Birmingham
2005, Ciara Ní Chondúin, Aidan Hill & Michael Harrison, County Tipperary
2006, Danielle O’Riordan, John Neville & Katie Lucey, County Kerry
2007, Sean & Gearóid Keane & Cormac Murphy, County Kildare
2008, Alan Egan, Michael Mac Conraoí & Gearóidín Ní Cheallacháin, County Limerick
2009, Cian & Caoimhe Ní Chiaráin and Seán Farrell, County Sligo
2010, Máiréad & Aisling Ní Mhocháin & Seán Céitinn, County Cork
2012, Tanya Murphy, Darina Gleeson and Stephanie Carthy. County Wexford
2013, Alan Finn, Rory Mc Mahon & Eoin O' Sullivan, County Cork
2014, Eimear Coughlan, Francis Cunningham & Marian Curtin, An Tulach/Croisín/Laichtín Naofa
2015, Daithí Gormley, Cian & Caoimhe Kearins, County Sligo
2016, Áine Nic Gearailt (FitzGerald), Ciarán Mac Gearailt (FitzGerald) & Cormac Mac Aodhagán, County Kildare
2017, Tomás Quinn, Michael Kerr, Christopher Maguire, County Tyrone
2018, Aileen De Burca, Deirdre De Barra & Eibhlin De Barra, County Mayo
2019, Jack Boyle, Orlaith McAuliffe & Christopher Maguire, London
2022, Aoibhin Morgan, Lucia Morgan & Oisin Bradley, County Down

Céilí Band (Buíon Cheoil Chéilí)

1951, Athlone 'B' Band, County Westmeath
1952, Williamstown Girls' Ceili Band, County Roscommon
1953, Aughrim Slopes Céilí Band, County Galway
1954, Kilfenora Céilí Band, County Clare, Athlone Céilí Band, County Westmeath, and Moyglass Céilí Band, County Wexford (tie)
1955, Kilfenora Céilí Band, County Clare
1956, Kilfenora Céilí Band, County Clare
1957, Tulla Céilí Band, County Clare
1958, Kincora Céilí Band, County Dublin
1959, Leitrim Céilí Band, County Galway
1960, Tulla Céilí Band, County Clare
1961, Kilfenora Céilí Band, County Clare
1962, Leitrim Céilí Band, County Galway
1963, Liverpool Céilí Band, Liverpool
1964, Liverpool Céilí Band, Liverpool
1965, Castle Céilí Band, County Dublin
1966, Glenside Céilí Band, London
1967, Siamsa Céilí Band, County Louth
1968, Siamsa Céilí Band, County Louth
1969, Siamsa Céilí Band, County Louth
1970, Bridge Céilí Band, County Laois
1971, Green Linnet Céilí Band, County Dublin
1972, Brosna Céilí Band, County Kerry;
1973, Bridge Céilí Band, County Laois
1974, Bridge Céilí Band, County Laois
1975, Pipers Club Céilí Band, County Dublin
1976, Pipers Club Céilí Band, County Dublin
1977, Longridge Céilí Band, County Offaly
1978, Longridge Céilí Band, County Offaly
1979, Ormond Céilí Band, County Tipperary
1980, Ormond Céilí Band, County Tipperary
1981, Ormond Céilí Band, County Tipperary
1982, Longridge Céilí Band, County Offaly
1983, Pride of Erin Céilí Band, County Fermanagh
1984, Ormond Céilí Band, County Tipperary
1985, Pride of Erin Céilí Band, County Fermanagh
1986, The Thatch Céilí Band, London, England
1987, The Thatch Céilí Band, London, England
1988, St. Colmcille's Céilí Band, St. Albans, Hertfordshire, England
1989, Siamsa Céilí Band, County Louth
1990, Siamsa Céilí Band, County Louth
1991, St. Colmcille's Céilí Band, St. Albans
1992, Bridge Céilí Band, County Laois
1993, Kilfenora Céilí Band, County Clare
1994, Kilfenora Céilí Band, County Clare
1995, Kilfenora Céilí Band, County Clare
1996, Bridge Céilí Band, County Laois
1997, Bridge Céilí Band, County Laois
1998, Táin Céilí Band, County Louth
1999, Táin Céilí Band, County Louth
2000, Táin Céilí Band, County Louth
2001, Ennis Céilí Band, County Clare
2002, Ennis Céilí Band, County Clare
2003, Ennis Céilí Band, County Clare
2004, Naomh Pádraig Céilí Band, County Meath
2005, Naomh Pádraig Céilí Band, County Meath
2006, Naomh Pádraig Céilí Band, County Meath
2007, Allow Céilí Band, County Cork
2008, Innisfree Céilí Band, County Sligo
2009, Dartry Céilí Band, County Sligo
2010, Teampall An Ghleanntáin Céilí Band, County Limerick
2011, Shannonvale Céilí Band, County Kerry
2012, Awbeg Céilí Band, County Cork
2013, Moylurg Céilí band, County Roscommon
2014, Knockmore Ceili Band, County Fermanagh
2015, Shandrum Céilí Band, County Cork
2016, Shandrum Céilí Band, County Cork
2017, Shandrum Céilí Band, County Cork
2018, Blackwater Céilí Band, County Tyrone
2019, Cnoc na Gaoithe Céilí Band, County Clare
2022, Taobh na Mara Céilí Band, County Waterford

Instrumental Groups (Grúpaí Ceoil)

1979, Armagh Pipers Club, County Armagh
1980, Ceoltóirí Mágh Ealla, Mallow, Co. Cork
1981, Ceoltóirí Mágh Ealla, Mallow, Co. Cork
1982, Ceoltóirí Mágh Ealla, Mallow, Co. Cork
1983, Ryan Family Group, County Tipperary
1984, Shamrock, Paris, France
1985, St. Alban's Group, Herts., UK
1986, St. James Gate, San Antonio, Texas
1987, Ballishall, County Wicklow
1989, Loughmore Senior Grúpa Ceoil 
1990, Corrib Traditional Group, County Galway
1991, Ma Rua/Ceapach Mór, County Limerick
1992, Teampall an Ghleanntáin, County Limerick
1993, Urlan Grúpa Cheoil, County Clare
1994, Cois Locha, Portglenone, County Antrim
1995, Tara, Manchester
1996, St. Michael's, County Limerick
1997, Craobh Naithi CCE, County Dublin
1998, Grupa Cheoil Cholmain Naofa Clar Choinne Mhuiris, County Mayo
1999, Ballydonoghue / Lisselton CCÉ, County Kerry
2000, St. Michael's, County Limerick
2001, CCÉ, Teampall an Ghleanntáin, County Limerick
2002, Éamon Ó Muirí CCÉ, County Monaghan
2003, South Birmingham CCÉ, Birmingham
2004, St. Louis Irish Arts Grúpa Cheoil, St. Louis
2005, Ceoltóirí Craobh na Coradh, County Clare
2006, Ceoltóirí Mhuscraí, County Cork
2007, St. Rochs, Irish Minstrels Branch, Glasgow, Scotland
2008, CCÉ, Teampall an Ghleanntáin, County Limerick
2009, CCÉ, Fred Finn, County Sligo
2010, CCÉ, Teampall An Ghleanntáin, County Limerick
2011, CCÉ, Edenderry, County Offaly
2012, Ceoltóirí Coillte, Illinois, USA
2013, CCÉ, Guaire Baile Ghearóid, County Wexford
2014, Ceoltóirí Cois Féile, County Kerry
2016, Ceoltóirí Knockfennell, CCÉ Caisleán Uí Chonaill/Atháin/Baile Iobaird, County Limerick
2017, St Roch's, Glasgow, Scotland
2018, Tairseach, CCÉ Cill Shléibhe/Tulach Sheasta, County Tipperary
2019, Ceoltóirí Tireragh, County Sligo
2022, Tigh na Coille, County Clare

Accordion Bands (Buíon Cheoil Cáirdin)

1984, Mayobridge Youth Band, County Down
1985, St. Patrick's Accordion Band, County Down
1987, St. Patrick's Accordion Band, County Donegal
1988, St Oliver Plunkett Accordion Band, Strabane Co, Tyrone
1989, St Marys Accordion Band, Convoy, Co, Donegal
1990, St Oliver Plunkett Accordion Band, Strabane Co, Tyrone
1991, St. Patrick's Accordion Band, Drumkein, County Donegal
1992, St Oliver Plunkett Accordion Band, Keady Co, Armagh
1993, St Oliver Plunkett Accordion Band, Keady Co, Armagh
1994, St Oliver Plunkett Accordion Band, Strabane Co, Tyrone
1995, St Oliver Plunkett Accordion Band, Keady Co, Armagh
1996, Fanad Accordion Band, County Donegal
1997, Fanad Accordion Band, County Donegal
1998, St. Miguels Band, Downpatrick, County Down
1999, Mayobridge Youth Band, County Down
2000, Mayobridge Youth Band, County Down
2001, Mayobridge Youth Band, County Down
2002, K & S Accordion Band, County Meath
2003, Mayobridge Youth Band, County Down
2004, Saint Enda Accordion Band, County Monaghan
2005, St. Brigid's Accordion Band, Jonesboro, County Armagh
2006, Mayobridge Youth Band, County Down
2007, St. Brigid's Accordion Band, Jonesboro, County Armagh
2008, St. Brigid's Accordion Band, Jonesboro, County Armagh
2009, St. Brigid's Accordion Band, Jonesboro, County Armagh
2010, Holy Cross Accordion Band, Atticall, County Down
2011, Holy Cross Accordion Band, Atticall, County Down
2012, St. Brigid's Accordion Band, Jonesboro, County Armagh
2013, St. Brigid's Accordion Band, Jonesboro, County Armagh
2014, Holy Cross Accordion Band Atticall, County Down
2015, St. Brigid's Accordion Band, Jonesboro, County Armagh
2016, Holy Cross Accordion Band Atticall, County Down
2017, Holy Cross Accordion Band Atticall, County Down
2018, Holy Cross Accordion Band Atticall, County Down
2019, No Competitors
2022, No Competitors

Flute Bands (Buíon Cheoil Feadóg Mhór)

1984, Harry Hickey Flute band, Atha Cliath
1985, Clooney Flute Band, County Antrim
1986, Clooney Flute Band, County Antrim
1987, Droma Mor  Rann na Feirste, County Donegal
1988, Clooney Flute Bcand, County Antrim
1989, Clooney Flute Band, County Antrim
1990, Droma Mor Rann Na Feirste, Co Donegal
1991, Droma Mor Rann Na Feirste, Co Donegal
1992, Mullaghduff Fife & Drum Band, County Donegal
1993, Clooney Flute Band, County Antrim
1994, Mullaghduff Fife & Drum Band, County Donegal
1995, Mullaghduff Fife & Drum Band, County Donegal
1996, Mullaghduff Fife & Drum Band, County Donegal
1997, Maghery Fife & Drum Band, County Donegal
1998, Maghery Fife & Drum Band, County Donegal
1999, Mullaghduff Fife & Drum Band, County Donegal
2000, Droma Mor  Rann na Feirste, County Donegal
2001, Maghery Fife & Drum Band, County Donegal
2002, Maghery Fife & Drum Band, County Donegal
2003, Buion Ceoil Cnoiceach Mór, Burtonport, County Donegal
2004, Buion Ceoil Cnoiceach Mór, Burtonport, County Donegal
2005, Buion Ceoil Cnoiceach Mór, Burtonport, County Donegal
2006, Mullaghduff Fife & Drum Band, County Donegal 
2007, Mullaghduff Fife & Drum Band, County Donegal
2008, Mullaghduff Fife & Drum Band, County Donegal
2009, Mullaghduff Fife & Drum Band, County Donegal 
2010, Mullaghduff Fife & Drum Band, County Donegal
2011, Mullaghduff Fife & Drum Band, County Donegal
2012, Mullaghduff Fife & Drum Band, County Donegal
2013, Mullaghduff Fife & Drum Band, County Donegal
2014, Mullaghduff Fife & Drum Band, County Donegal
2015, Maghery Fife & Drum Band, County Donegal
2016, Maghery Fife & Drum Band, County Donegal
2017, Maghery Fife & Drum Band, County Donegal
2018, Maghery Fife & Drum Band, County Donegal
2019, Maghery Fife & Drum Band, County Donegal
2022, Maghery Fife & Drum Band, County Donegal

Miscellaneous Marching Bands (Buíon Rogha Gléas)

1975, Acres National School Band, Burtonport, County Donegal
1976, Killeshill Youth Band, County Tyrone
1977, Claremorris Marching Band, County Mayo
1983, Convent of Mercy Marching Band, County Mayo
1984, St. Cecilia's Youth Band, Lisnaskea, County Fermanagh (Junior)
1985, St. Crona's Accordion Band, Dungloe, County Donegal
1985, St. Cecilia's Youth Band, Lisnaskea, County Fermanagh (Senior)
1986, Clochaneely Marching Band, County Donegal
1987, St. Macartan's Band, County Fermanagh
1979, St. Patricks Accordion Band, County Tyrone
1991, St. Crona's Accordion Band, Dungloe, Co. Donegal
1993, St. Cecilia's Band, Aughnamullen, County Monaghan
1994, St. Cecilia's Band, Aughnamullen, County Monaghan
1995, St. Cecilia's Band, Aughnamullen, County Monaghan
1996, St. Columba's Band, County Donegal
1999, St. Mary's Band Broomfield, County Monaghan
2000, St. Mary's Band Broomfield, County Monaghan
2001, St. Mary's Band Broomfield, County Monaghan
2002, Buíon Cheoil Chloich Cheann Fhaola, County Donegal
2003, St. Mary's Band Broomfield, County Monaghan
2004, St. Crona's Band, Dungloe, County Donegal
2005, St. Mary's Band Broomfield, County Monaghan
2006, Donaghmoyne Band, County Monaghan
2007, St. Mary's, Castleblayney Band, County Monaghan
2008, St. Mary's, Castleblayney Band, County Monaghan
2009, Banna Ceoil, Ramelton, County Donegal
2010, Ramelton, Ráth Mealton, County Donegal
2011, Buncrana, County Donegal
2012, Ramelton Town Snr Miscellaneous Band, County Donegal
2013, Ramelton Town Snr Miscellaneous Band, County Donegal
2014, Ramelton Town Snr Miscellaneous Band, County Donegal
2017, Buion Cheoil Sinsear Chloich Cheann Fhaola, County Donegal
2018, Buion Cheoil Sinsear Chloich Cheann Fhaola, County Donegal
2019, Ramelton Town Snr Miscellaneous Band, County Donegal
2022, Mullingar Town Band, County Westmeath

Pipe Bands (Buíon Cheoil Phíob)
Note that the All-Ireland Fleadh Championships are unrelated to the All-Ireland Pipe Band Championships organised jointly by the Irish Pipe Band Association (IPBA) and the Northern Ireland Branch of the Royal Scottish Pipe Band Association (RSPBANI).

1985, O'Neill Pipe Band, County Armagh
1987, O'Neill Pipe Band, County Armagh
1991, Annsborough Pipe Band, County Down
1992, Clonoe Independent Pipe Band, Co Tyrone
1993, Clonoe Independent Pipe Band, Co Tyrone
1994, Clonoe Independent Pipe Band, Co Tyrone
1996, Aghagallon Pipe Band, County Armagh
2001, Buíon Cheoil Phíb Mhór Cloghfin, County Tyrone
2002, Aughnamullen Pipe Band, County Monaghan
2003, Achill Schools, County Mayo
2004, St. Joseph's Pipe Band, County Down
2005, St. Joseph's Pipe Band, County Down
2006, Edendork Pipe Band, County Tyron
2007, Edendork Pipe Band, County Tyrone
2008, Edendork Pipe Band, County Tyrone
2010, Buíon Cheoil Phíb Mhór Cloghfin, County Tyrone
2011, St Josephs Pipe Band, Longstone, County Down
2012, Crimlin Batafada Pipe Band, County Mayo
2013, Corduff Pipe Band, County Monaghan
2014, Corduff Pipe Band, County Monaghan
2016, Achill Pipe Band, County Mayo
2017, Achill Pipe Band, County Mayo
2018, St Josephs Pipe Band, Longstone, County Down
2022, No Competitors

Irish Singing - Ladies (Amhrán Gaeilge - Mná)

1957, Rós Máire Ní Giollarnath, County Galway
1975, Lena Bn. Uí Shé, County Xxxxx
1976, Nora McDonagh, Chicago
1977, Mary Cooley, Chicago
1979, Eibhlín Briscoe, County Tipperary
1983, Máiréad Ní Oistín, County Dublin
1985, Karen Breathnach, County Kerry
1987, Nóra Ní Dhonnacha, County Galway
1996, Mary Gallagher, County Cork
1998  Mairéad Ní Fhlatharta, County Galway
1999, Caitríona Ní Laoire, County Meath
2000, Karen Ní Thrinsigh, County Kerry
2001, Karen Ní Thrinsigh, County Kerry
2002, Treasa Bn. Uí Chonaill, County Galway
2003, Astrid Ní Mhongáin, County Mayo
2004, Bairbre Uí Theighneáin, Clonaslee, Co. Laois
2005, Máire Ní Choilm, County Donegal
2006, Nollaig Nic Andriú, County Mayo
2007, Rachel Ní Ghairbheith, County Roscommon
2008, Nollaig Ní Laiore, County Meath
2009, Gobnait Ní Chrualaoi, County Cork
2010, Róisín Ní Riain, County Kerry
2011, Gobnait Ní Chrualaoí, County Cork
2012, Muireann Ní Luasa, County Cork
2013, Clár Nic Ruairi, City of Derry
2014, Sailí Ní Dhroighneáin, County Galway
2015, Paula Ní Chualáin, County Galway
2016, Eimear Arkins, Missouri, USA
2017, Gráinne Ní Fhatharta, County Galway
2018, Danielle Ní Chéilleachair, County Cork
2019, Kathryn Ní Mhaolán, City of Derry
2022, Clíona Ní Ghallachóir, County Donegal

Irish Singing - Men (Amhrán Gaeilge - Fir)

1956, Sean Quinn, County Clare
1975, T. O’Duinnon, County Xxxxx
1976, Clement Mac Suibhne, County Donegal
1977, Seosamh Mac Donnacha, County Galway
1979, Maithiún Ó Caoimh, County Tipperary
1982, Martin Joyce, Leeds
1983, Seán Ó Cróinín, County Cork
1984, John Flanagan, County Galway
1985, Martin Joyce, Leeds
1986, Seán Mac Craith, County Waterford
1987, Dara Bán Mac Dhonnacha, County Galway
1988, Risteard Ó hEidhín
1989, Philip Enright, County Limerick
1991, Patrick Connolly
1992, Diarmuid Ó Cathasaigh, County Cork
1993, Patrick Connolly
1994, Padraic McNulty, County Mayo
1995, Naoise Ó Mongáin, County Mayo
1996, Bartlae Breathnach, County Galway
1997, Traolach Ó Conghaile, County Mayo
1998, Traolach Ó Conghaile, County Mayo
1999, Naoise Ó Mongáin, County Mayo
2000, Traolach Ó Conghaile, County Mayo
2001, Ciarán Ó Coincheanainn, County Galway
2002, Eoghan Warner, County Kerry
2003, Naoise Ó Mongáin, County Mayo
2004, Tadhg Ó Meachair, County Tipperary
2005, Coireall Mac Curtain, County Limerick
2006, Colm McDonagh, County Galway
2007, Liam Ó Cróinín, County Cork
2008, Breandán Ó Ceannabháin, County Galway
2009, Breandán Ó Ceannabháin, County Galway
2010, Seosamh Ó Críodáin, County Kerry
2011, Seosamh Ó Críodáin, County Kerry
2012, Seosamh Ó Críodáin, County Kerry
2013, Anraí Ó Domhnaill, County Donegal
2014, Anraí Ó Domhnaill, County Donegal
2015, Conchubhar Ó Luasa, County Cork
2016, Anraí Ó Domhnaill, County Donegal
2017, Ciarán Ó Donnabháin, County Cork
2018, Lughaidh Mac an Iascaire, County Dublin
2019, Proinnsias O Cathasaigh, County Kerry
2022, Piaras Ó Lorcáin, County Armagh

English Singing - Ladies (Amhrán Béarla - Mná)

19??, Rita Gallagher, County Donegal; (three times winner - years unknown)
1969, Nora Butler, County Tipperary
1970, Nora Butler, County Tipperary
1971, Nora Butler, County Tipperary
1972, Anne Brolly, City of Derry
1975, M. O’Reilly, County Xxxxx
1976, Pauline Sweeney, County Donegal
1977, Pauline Sweeney, County Donegal
1978, Pauline Sweeney, County Donegal
1979, Rita Gallager, County Donegal
1983, Siobhan O'Donnell, London, England
1985, Rose Daly, County Offaly
1986, Rose Daly, County Offaly
1987, Rose Daly, County Offaly
1991, Karen Walsh, County Kerry
1995, Catherine Mc Laughlin (née Nugent), County Fermanagh 
1996, Christina Pierce, County Roscommon
1997, Fionnuala O' Reilly, County Leitrim
1999, Máire Ní Chéilleachair, County Cork
2000, Astrid Ní Mhongáin, County Mayo
2001, Deirdre Scanlon, County Limerick
2002, Sharon Buckley, County Kerry
2003, Ann Marie Kavanagh, County Tipperary
2004, Christina Pierce, County Roscommon
2005, Brigid Delaney, County Kildare
2006, Brigid Delaney, County Kildare
2007, Kate Ford, County Donegal
2008, Amelia Ní Mhurchú, County Monaghan
2009, Shauna McGarrigle, County Offaly
2010, Denise Whelan, County Clare
2011, Eibhlín Máire Ní Dhuibhir, County Limerick
2012, Eibhlín Ní Bhrúdair, County Limerick
2013, Eimear Arkins, County Clare
2014, Cáit Ní Bhrúdair Uí Mhurchú, County Limerick
2015, Kathryn Nea, County Westmeath
2019, Julie-Ann McCaffrey, County Fermanagh
2022, Cáit Ní Bhaoghill, County Monaghan

English Singing - Men (Amhrán Béarla - Fir)

1971, Len Graham, County Louth
1972, Oliver Mulligan, County Monaghan
1973, Frank Harte, County Dublin
1975, Peter Nolan, County Offaly
1976, Paddy Berry, County Wexford
1977, Vincent Crowley, Bantry, County Cork
1979, John Cronin, Drinagh, County Cork
1983, Vincent Crowley, Bantry, County Cork
1985, John Furlong, County Wexford
1986, Seán Ó Dálaigh Contae Átha Cliath
1987, Gerard McQuaid, County Monaghan
1996, John Power, County Waterford
1997, John Power, County Waterford
1998, Maurice Foley, County Cork
1999, John Furlong, County Wexford
2000, Séamus Brogan, St. Albans, England
2001, Jon Jon Williams, County Londonderry
2002, Brian Hart, St. Louis, USA
2003, Cathal Lynch, County Tyrone
2004, Donal Bowe, County Tipperary
2005, Dónal Ó Liatháin, County Limerick
2006, Seán Breen, County Kerry
2007, Niall Wall (Niall de Bhál), County Wexford
2008, Padraic Keena (Padhraic Ó Cionnaith), County Westmeath
2009, Tadhg Maher (Tadhg Ó Meachair), County Tipperary
2010, Cian Ó Ciaráin, County Sligo
2011, Cathal O'Neill, County Tyrone
2012, Peadar Sherry, County Monaghan
2013, Daoirí Farrell, County Dublin
2014, Micheál O'Shea, County Kerry
2019, Kevin Elam, Washington DC, USA
2022, Vincent Crowley, County Cork

Whistling (Feadaíl)

1966, Tom McHale, County Roscommon
1974, Joe Harris, County Kildare 
1975, Paddy Berry, County Wexford
1976, Seamus O'Donnell, County Sligo
1977, Paddy Berry, County Wexford
1979, Michael Creavers, County Galway
1983, Walter O'Hara, County Wexford
1984, Liam Gaul, County Wexford
1985, Paddy O'Donnell, County Galway
1986, M.J. O'Reilly, County Wexford
1987, Padraig Ó Raithbheartaigh, County Galway
1996, Michael Ryan, County Tipperary
1990, John O'Connell, County Antrim
1998, Síle Áine de Barra, County Cork
1999, Sean White, County Waterford
2000, Frances Donahue, County Galway
2001, Séan Seosamh Mac Domhnaill, County Mayo
2002, Séan Seosamh Mac Domhnaill, County Mayo
2003, Ainíde Uí Bhennéis, County Limerick (CCÉ Teampall a' Gleanntain)
2004, Ainíde Uí Bhennéis, County Limerick (CCÉ Teampall a' Gleanntain)
2005, Ainíde Uí Bhennéis, County Limerick (CCÉ Teampall a' Gleanntain)
2006, Ainíde Uí Bhennéis, County Limerick (CCÉ Teampall a' Gleanntain)
2007, Máiréad Ní Chorradáin, County Kerry (CCÉ Teampall a' Gleanntain)
2008, Tony Connolly, County Galway
2009, Claire McNicholl, City of Derry
2010, Ailéin Ó Dubhuir, County Wexford
2011, Ailéin Ó Dubhuir, County Wexford
2012, Ailéin Ó Dubhuir, County Wexford
2013, Ailéin Ó Dubhuir, County Wexford
2014, Séamus Ó hAirtnéide, County Limerick
2018, Ainíde Uí Bhennéis, County Limerick (CCE Teampall a' Ghleanntáin)
2019, Liam Jones, County Clare
2022, Liam Jones, County Clare

Lilting (Portaireacht)

1954, Paddy Tunney, County Fermanagh (inaugural year for lilting)
1955, Paddy Tunney, County Fermanagh
1956, Paddy Tunney, County Fermanagh
1959, Seamus Fay, County Cavan
1960, Seamus Fay, County Cavan
1961, Seamus Fay, County Cavan
1963, Micheal O'Rourke, Co. Leitrim
1964, Micky McCann, Co. Tyrone
1967, Josie McDermott, County Sligo
1969, Seamus Fay, County Cavan
1975, Joseph Harris, County Kildare
1976, Joseph Harris, County Kildare
1977, Vincent Crowley, County Cork
1978, Michael Rafferty, County Galway
1979, M.J. O'Reilly, County Wexford
1980, M.J. O'Reilly, County Wexford
1981, Oliver Kearney, County Kildare
1982, M.J. O'Reilly, County Wexford
1983, Michael Craven, County Galway
1985, M.J. O'Reilly, County Wexford
199x, John Culhane, County Limerick
199x, John Culhane, County Limerick
199x, John Culhane, County Limerick
199x, John Culhane, County Limerick
199x, John Culhane, County Limerick
1987, Padraig Ó Raithbheartaigh, County Galway
1996, Caitrona Cullivan, County Cavan
1999, Bernadette Collins, County Cork
2000, Seán Ó Cathaláin, County Limerick
2001, Seán Ó Cathaláin, County Limerick
2002, Seán Ó Cathaláin, County Limerick
2003, Tadhg Maher, County Tipperary
2004, Tommy Stone, County Offaly
2005, Seán Breen, County Kerry
2006, Séan Ó Cathaláin, County Limerick
2007, Seán Breen, County Kerry
2008, Cian Kearns (Cian Ó Ciaráin), County Sligo
2009, Seán Breen, County Kerry
2010, Paul O'Reilly (Pól Ó Raghallaigh), County Wexford
2011, Caoimhe Ní Chiaráin,(Caoimhe Kearins) County Sligo
2012, Eibhlín Ní Bhrúdair, County Limerick
2013, Aoife Colféir, County Wexford
2014, Donal Tydings, County Kerry
2019, Donagh McElligott, County Kerry
2022, Liam Jones, County Clare

Irish Singing - Newly Composed Songs (Amhrán Nuacheaptha Gaeilge)

1975, M. McGinley, County Donegal
1976, M. McGinley, County Donegal
1977, Máire Ní Bhaoil, County Monaghan
1979, M.J. O' Reilly, County Wexford
1982, M.J. O' Reilly, County Wexford
1983, Seán Ó Cathasaigh, County Cork
1985, Colm Mac Confhaola, County Wexford
1987, Jack McCutheon, County Wexford
1996, Frances Donahue, County Galway
1999, Ciarán Ó Concheanainn, County Galway
2000, Matthew Gormally, County Galway
2001, Brenda O'Sullivan, County Dublin
2002, Brenda O'Sullivan, County Dublin
2003, Sarah Stone, County Offaly
2004, Dick Beamish, County Cork
2005, Seán Ó Muimhneacháin, County Cork
2006, Seán Ó Muimhneacháin, County Cork
2007, Seán Ó Muimhneacháin, County Cork
2008, Seán Ó Muimhneacháin, County Cork
2009, Seán Ó Muimhneacháin, County Cork
2010, Eilís Ní Shúilleabháin, County Cork
2011, Seán Ó Múimhneacháin, County Cork
2012, Diarmaid Ó hEachthigheirn, County Cork
2013, Liam Ó Riain, County Waterford
2014, Seán Ó Muimhneacháin, County Cork
2016, Nodlaig Ní Bhrollaigh, County Londonderry
2019, Seán Ó Muimhneacháin, County Cork
2022, Seán Ó Muimhneacháin, County Cork

English Singing - Newly Composed Songs (Amhrán Nuacheaptha, Bearla)

1975, John Cronin, Drinagh, County Cork
1976, Barbara Juppe, New York
1977, John Flanagan, County Clare
1979, Joseph Mulhern, City of Derry
1983, Tony Waldron, County Galway
1984, Seán Ó Dálaigh, 
1985, Paddy Blake, County Wicklow
1986, Seán Ó Dalaigh, 
1987, Pádraig Ó Raithbheartaigh, County Galway
1996, Dan Keane, County Kerry
1996, Dan Keane, County Kerry
1999, Dan Keane, County Kerry
2000, Colm O'Donnell, County Sligo
2001, Dan Keane, County Kerry
2002, Niall Wall, County Wexford
2003, Pete McAleer, Newport, Wales
2004, Bruce Scott, Liverpool
2005, Séan Ó Muimhneacháin, County Cork
2006, Bruce Scott, Liverpool
2007, Mary Ryan, County Kildare
2008, Étaoin Rowe, West London
2009, Terry Cowan, County Down
2010, Muiris Mac Giolla Choda, County Cork
2011, Muiris Mac Giolla Choda, County Cork
2012, Padhraig Ó Tuathail, County Mayo
2013, Shauna McGarrigle, County Offaly
2014, Etaoin Rowe, London, England
2015, Julie-Ann McCaffrey, County Fermanagh
2019, Joe Kelly, County Westmeath
2022, Terry Cowan, County Down

Newly Composed Tunes (Píosaí Ceoil Nuaceaptha)
2011, Marie Walsh, County Galway
2012, Nóirín Ní Shúilleabháin, County Galway
2013, Keelan Mac Craith, County Tipperary
2014, Donagh McElligott, County Kerry
2015, Blaithín Kennedy, County Tipperary
2016, Jody Moran, Victoria, Australia
2017, Jody Moran, Victoria, Australia
2018, Joanne O'Connor, County Limerick
2019, Meibh Ní Dhubhlaioch, County Offaly
2022, Laoise Ní Chinnéide, County Tipperary

8-Hand Céilí Dancing, Ladies (Rince Céilí Ochtair, Mná)
2011, Sliabh Luachra CCÉ, County Kerry
2012, Sliabh Luachra CCÉ, County Kerry
2013, Sliabh Luachra CCÉ, County Kerry
2014, Caisleán Nua, County Tipperary
2022, Fioreann Sarah, County Offaly

8-Hand Céilí Dancing, Mixed (Rince Céilí Ochtair, Measctha)
2011, Foireann Rince Mhuineacháin, Emyvale, County Monaghan
2012, Emyvale CCÉ, County Monaghan
2013, Craobh Bheartla Uí Fhlatharta, CCÉ, County Kildare
2014, Emyvale CCÉ, County Monaghan
2022, CCÉ, Ardacha/Carraigchiarraí, County Limerick

4-Hand Céilí Dancing, Ladies (Rince Céilí Ceathrair, Mná)
2011, Sliabh Luachra CCÉ, County Kerry
2012, Gleann Fleisce CCÉ, County Kerry
2013, Gleann Fleisce A, CCÉ, County Kerry
2014, Gleann Fleisce A, County Kerry
2022, Mullingar CCÉ, County Westmeath

4-Hand Céilí Dancing, Mixed (Rince Céilí Ceathrair, Measctha)
2011, Foireann Rince Mhuineacháin, Emyvale, County Monaghan
2012, CCÉ, Teampall an Ghleanntáin, County Limerick
2013, Naomh Chiaráin, CCÉ, County Kerry
2014, Ballyduff/Ballinvella/Ballysaggart, County Waterford
2022, CCÉ, Ardacha/Carraigchiarraí, County Limerick

Set Dancing - Full Set, Ladies (Rince Seit, Mná)

1987, Gael Colmcille, County Meath
1988, Stoneybatter Set, Dublin
1989, Stoneybatter Set, Dublin
1990, Stoneybatter Set, Dublin
1996, Carrickcruppen Set
1998, Elphin County Roscommon
1999, Kilcummin Set, County Kerry
2000, Galbally/Ballyhogue, County Wexford
2001, Kilcummin, County Kerry
2002, Elphin Set, County Roscommon
2003, Gleneagle, County Kerry
2004, Gleneagle, County Kerry
2005, Glenflesk, County Kerry
2006, Abbeyknockmoy, County Galway
2007, Glenflesk (Gleann Fleisce), County Kerry
2008, Abbeyknockmoy, County Galway
2009, St. Ciara's, County Clare
2010, Cill Áirne, County Kerry
2011, Abbeyknockmoy, County Galway
2012, Caisleán Nua, County Tipperary
2013, Spa - Cill Áirne, County Kerry
2014, Spa - Cill Áirne, County Kerry
2018, Rithim an Chláir, CCÉ, Laichtín Naofa, County Clare
2022, CCÉ, Cill Áirne, County Kerry

Set Dancing - Full Set, Mixed (Rince Seit, Measctha)

1990, The Banner Set, County Clare
1995, Elphin Set, County Roscommon
1996, Elphin set, County Roscommon
1997, Elphin Set, County Roscommon
1998, Tulla Set,  County Clare
1999, Elphin Set, County Roscommon
2000, Abbeyknockmoy, County Galway
2001, Gleneagle, County Kerry
2002, Abbeyknockmoy, County Galway
2003, Gleneagle, County Kerry
2004, Gleneagle, County Kerry
2005, Knockcroghery, County Roscommon
2006, Glenflesk (Gleann Fleisce), County Kerry
2007, Glenflesk (Gleann Fleisce), County Kerry
2008, Kincora, County Clare
2009, Diabhlaíocht na hÓige, County Clare
2010, Rhythm of the Banner, County Clare
2011, Drithle an Iarthair, County Clare
2012, Kilcummin, County Kerry - Rehabs
2013, Céimeanna - Cill Áirne, County Kerry
2014, Ceimeanna - Cill Airne, County Kerry
2015, Ceimeanna - Cill Airne, County Kerry
2016, Rithim an Clair, County Clare
2017, Ceimeanna - Cill Airne, County Kerry
2018, Kilcummin, County Kerry
2022, Craobh an Choisdellibhe/Róisín Bn Uí Cheallaigh, County Mayo

Set Dancing - Half Set, Mixed (Rince Leathsheit, Measctha)

2007, Glenflesk (Gleann Fleisce), County Kerry
2008, Cuilmore, County Mayo
2009, CCÉ, Cill Chuimín, County Kerry
2010, Ballyroan, County Laois
2011, Ballyduff/Ballinvella/Ballysaggart, CCÉ, County Waterford
2012, Kilcummin, County Kerry
2013, Ballyroan, County Laois
2014, Átha 'n Caoire, County Cork
2022, CCÉ, Kilcummin, County Kerry

Full Set, Mixed, Over 35 (Rince Seit Measctha, Os cionn 35)

2011, Ruagairí an Chláir, County Clare
2012, Ballyduff/Ballinvella/Ballysaggart, County Waterford
2013, Spa - Cill Áirne, County Kerry
2014, Kilcummin CCÉ, County Kerry
2022, Bunbrosna, County Westmeath

Old Style Dancing (Rince ar an Sean Nós)

2011, Una Ní Fhlatharta, County Kildare
2012, Sharleen McCaffrey, County Westmeath
2013, Siobhán Ní Ghionntaigh, County Mayo
2014, John Joyce, County Galway
2015, John Joyce, County Galway
2016, John Joyce, County Galway
2022, Eoin Killeen, County Clare

See also
Traditional Irish Singers
Comhaltas Ceoltóirí Éireann
Irish Traditional Music

References 

Irish music-related lists
All-Ireland Fleadh champions
Irish set dance